Elections to Mid Bedfordshire District Council were held on 1 May 2003. All 53 seats were up for election. Councillors elected would serve a four-year term, expiring in 2007. The Conservative Party retained overall control of the council, winning 37 of 53 seats on the council.  The Conservatives won 7 seats (5 wards) unopposed.

Result

Ward Results
All results are listed below:

This election was the first with the new ward boundaries.

Figures on turnout were taken from Plymouth University's Elections Centre, which gives the number of registered voters, and the percentage turnout for each ward.  The number of ballots cast for each ward was calculated from these.  Percentage change in turnout is compared with the same ward in the 1999 District Council election.

The percentage of the vote for each candidate was calculated compared with the number of ballots cast in the ward.  Note that in a ward with more than one seat, voters were allowed to place as many crosses on the ballot paper as seats.  The percentage change for each candidate is compared with the same candidate in the 1999 District Council election.

Candidates who were members of the council before the election are marked with an asterisk.

Ampthill

Arlesey

Aspley Guise

Biggleswade Holme

Biggleswade Ivel

Biggleswade Stratton

Clifton and Meppershall

Cranfield

Flitton, Greenfield and Pulloxhill

Flitwick East

Flitwick West

Harlington

Houghton, Haynes, Southill and Old Warden

Langford and Henlow Village

Marston

Maulden and Clophill

Northill and Blunham

Potton and Wensley

Sandy Ivel

Sandy Pinnacle

Shefford, Campton and Gravenhurst

Shillington, Stondon and Henlow Camp

Silsoe

Stotfold

Westoning and Tingrith

Woburn

Notes

References 

2003
2003 English local elections